The Fairview Sanatorium is a former tuberculosis sanatorium at 905 North Main Street in Normal, Illinois. McLean County built the sanatorium in 1919 following a public referendum and a decade-long campaign by the McLean County Anti-Tuberculosis Society. The latter organization was spearheaded by Florence Fifer Bohrer, who was also the sanatorium's first secretary and went on to become the first woman elected to the Illinois Senate. Local architect Arthur L. Pillsbury designed the Colonial Revival building. As sunlight and fresh air were thought to be the best treatments for tuberculosis at the time, the rooms at the sanatorium featured large windows that were kept open for much of the year. In addition to housing up to 80 patients at a time, the sanatorium also served as the center of the county's public health campaign against tuberculosis, which included case tracking and public education. Improved treatments for tuberculosis gradually reduced the sanatorium's patient population over the following decades, and it closed in 1965.

The sanatorium was added to the National Register of Historic Places on September 21, 2021.

References

Tuberculosis sanatoria
National Register of Historic Places in McLean County, Illinois
Hospital buildings on the National Register of Historic Places in Illinois
Colonial Revival architecture in Illinois
Hospitals established in 1919